Otto Johann Maximilian Strasser (also , see ß; 10 September 1897 – 27 August 1974) was a German politician and an early member of the Nazi Party. Otto Strasser, together with his brother Gregor Strasser, was a leading member of the party's left-wing faction, and broke from the party due to disputes with the dominant Hitlerite faction. He formed the Black Front, a group intended to split the Nazi Party and take it from the grasp of Hitler. This group also functioned during his exile and World War II as a secret opposition group (Strasserism).

Career 

Born at Bad Windsheim, Strasser was the son of a Catholic judicial officer who lived in the Upper Bavarian market town of Geisenfeld. Strasser took an active part in World War I (1914-1918). On 2 August 1914, he joined the Bavarian Army as a volunteer. He rose through the ranks to lieutenant and was twice wounded. He returned to Germany in 1919, where he served in the Freikorps that in May 1919 put down the Bavarian Soviet Republic, which was organized on the principles of workers' councils. About this time he joined the Social Democratic Party.

In 1920, he participated in the opposition to the Kapp Putsch, but he grew increasingly alienated with his party's reformist stance, particularly when it put down a workers' uprising in the Ruhr, and he left the party later that year. In 1925, he joined the National Socialist German Workers' Party (NSDAP), in which his brother, Gregor, had been a member for several years, and worked for its newspaper as a journalist, ultimately taking it over with his brother. He focused particularly on the socialist elements of the party's program and led the party's faction in northern Germany together with his brother and Joseph Goebbels. His faction advocated support for ideologically Nazi unions, profit-sharing and – despite acknowledged differences – closer ties with the Soviet Union. 

Despite disagreements with Hitler, the Strassers did not represent a radical wing opposed to the party mainstream. Gottfried Feder was more radical and held great favour at the time. The Strassers were extremely influential within the party but the Strasserist programme was defeated at the Bamberg Conference of 1926. Otto Strasser, along with Gregor, continued as a leading Left Nazi within the party until he was expelled from the NSDAP in 1930.

After expulsion
Following his expulsion, he set up his own party, the Black Front, composed of like-minded former NSDAP members, in an attempt to split the Nazi Party. His party proved unable to counter Hitler's rise to power in 1933, and Strasser spent the years of the Nazi era in exile. The Nazi Left was annihilated during the Night of the Long Knives in 1934, in which Gregor Strasser was killed. This left Hitler as undisputed party leader and able to pacify both industrialists and the military into accepting his new Nazi regime. In addition to the Black Front, Strasser at this time headed the Free German Movement outside Germany; this group (founded in 1941) sought to enlist the aid of Germans throughout the world in bringing about the downfall of Hitler and his vision of Nazism.

Exile

Strasser fled first to Austria, then to Czechoslovakia (Prague), Switzerland, and France. In 1940 he went to Bermuda by way of Portugal, leaving a wife and two children behind in Switzerland. In 1941, he emigrated to Canada, where he became the famed "Prisoner of Ottawa". Goebbels denounced Strasser as the Nazis' "Public Enemy Number One" and a price of $500,000 was set on his head. He settled for a time in Montreal. In 1942, he lived for a time in Clarence, Nova Scotia, on a farm owned by a German-Czech, Adolph Schmidt, then moved to nearby  Paradise, where he lived for more than a decade in a rented apartment above a general store. As an influential and uncondemned former Nazi Party member still faithful to many doctrines of Nazism, he was initially prevented from returning to West Germany after the war, first by the  Allied powers and then by the West German government.

During his exile, he wrote articles on Nazi Germany and its leadership for several British, American, and Canadian newspapers, including the New Statesman, and a series for the Montreal Gazette, which was ghostwritten by then-Gazette reporter and later politician Donald C. MacDonald.

Return to Germany and later career 
In 1950, East Germany invited Strasser to become a member of the  National Front, but he declined, hoping that he would be permitted to return to Bavaria, which had been under US occupation until 1949. In his view, West Germany constituted an American colony and East Germany a Russian colony. He eventually gained West German citizenship, returned to Germany on 16 March 1955,
and settled in Munich.

He attempted to create a new "nationalist and socialist"-oriented party in 1956, the German Social Union (sometimes called a successor to the banned Socialist Reich Party (SRP) of Germany), but his organization was unable to attract any support. Strasser continued to advocate for  his vision of Nazism until he died in Munich in 1974.

Otto Strasser claimed that he was a dissenting Nazi regarding racial policies.
Throughout his life, he claimed to have actively opposed such policies within  the Nazi movement, for example, by organizing the removal of Julius Streicher from the German Völkisch Freedom Party.

Written works
 Hitler and I (translated by Eric Mosbacher and Gwenda David) [Hitler und Ich. Asmus-Bücher, Band 9. Johannes-Asmus-Verlag, Konstanz 1948.] First published in English in 1940, Boston: MA, Houghton Mifflin Company
 A History in My Time (translated by Douglas Reed)
 Germany Tomorrow (translated by Eric Mosbacher and Gwenda David)
 Gregor Strasser (written under the pseudonym of "Michael Geismeier")
 We Seek Germany (written under the pseudonym of "D.G.")
 Whither Hitler? (written under the pseudonym of "D.G.") [Wohin treibt Hitler? Darstellung der Lage und Entwicklung des Hitlersystems in den Jahren 1935 und 1936. Verlag Heinrich Grunov, Prag I 1936.]
 Europe Tomorrow (written under the pseudonym of "D.G.") [Europa von morgen. Das Ziel Masaryks. Weltwoche, Zürich 1939.]
 Structure of German Socialism [Aufbau des deutschen Sozialismus. Wolfgang-Richard-Lindner-Verlag, Leipzig 1932.]
 The German St. Bartholomew's Night [Die deutsche Bartholomäusnacht. Reso-Verlag, Zürich 1935.] 
 European Federation
 The Gangsters Around Hitler
 Hitler tritt auf der Stelle. Oxford gegen Staats-Totalität. Berlin – Rom – Tokio. Neue Tonart in Wien. NSDAP-Kehraus in Brasilien. Die dritte Front, Band 1937,6. Grunov, Prag 1937.
 Kommt es zum Krieg? Periodische Schriftenreihe der "Deutschen Revolution", Band 3. Grunov, Prag 1937.
 Der Faschismus. Geschichte und Gefahr. Politische Studien, Band 3. Günter-Olzog-Verlag, München (u.a.) 1965.
 Mein Kampf. Eine politische Autobiografie. Streit-Zeit-Bücher, Band 3. Heinrich-Heine-Verlag, Frankfurt am Main 1969.

See also
 Strasserism
 The European magazine

References

External links

 
Straßer, Otto in Neue Deutsche Biographie

1897 births
1974 deaths
People from Neustadt (Aisch)-Bad Windsheim
Nazi Party members
Nazi Party officials
Neo-Nazi politicians in Germany
Pan-European nationalism
People from the Kingdom of Bavaria
German anti-capitalists
German fascists
German Roman Catholics
German emigrants to Canada
German expatriates in Canada
German nationalists
German neo-Nazis
German socialists
German Army personnel of World War I
20th-century Freikorps personnel
Strasserism